Lycan is an unincorporated community in Baca County, Colorado, United States.  It is located approximately 37 driving miles east-northeast of Springfield, Colorado, the county seat. The U.S. Post Office at Two Buttes (ZIP Code 81084) now serves Lycan postal addresses.  The town is also referred to as Buckeye Crossroads.

Geography
Lycan is located at  (37.55765,-102.128605) at the junction of Colorado highways 89 and 116.

The community is just over 5 miles from the state border with Kansas.

References

Unincorporated communities in Baca County, Colorado
Unincorporated communities in Colorado